Blantyre is Malawi's second-largest city.

Blantyre may also refer to:
Blantyre District, of which the city is the capital
Blantyre, South Lanarkshire, a town in Scotland
Blantyre (ward), a local electoral division
Blantyre, Queensland, an Australian hamlet
Blantyre (estate), Massachusetts, United States
Blantyre, Toronto, part of Birch Cliff, a Canadian neighbourhood

See also
Blantyre House, a disused English prison and former mansion
Lord Blantyre, a title of nobility in the Peerage of Scotland